St. Xavier's Collegiate School (informally SXCS) is a private Catholic primary and secondary school for boys, located in Kolkata, West Bengal, India. The school was founded in 1860 by the Jesuits under the supervision of Fr. Henri Depelchin S.J., and it is named after St. Francis Xavier, a 16th-century Jesuit missionary to India. The school caters to approximately 2,300 students.

History
The school was founded in 1860 by the Society of Jesus, an all-male Catholic religious order. The school is named after St. Francis Xavier, a Spanish Jesuit saint. The founder of the school is Fr. Henri Depelchin, S.J., who oversaw most of the groundwork during the early years.

San Souci theatre
The San Souci theatre at 30 Park Street (now Mother Teresa Sarani), Kolkata-700016, was burned to the ground in 1843. The property was purchased by Jesuits from Belgium and became the present campus.

Foundation years
The motto,  (translated as "nothing beyond"), along with the crest of the college date to the rectorship of Fr. O'Neill, S.J., 1904–1913.

The present imposing five-storied building was built from 1934 to 1940 at a cost of Rs 9 lakhs, which was collected partly from the public of Calcutta, assistance from Belgium, and the huge rental received from the American army that occupied the building during World War II. Expansion of the school has been a long effort, with a campus slated for Salt Lake City, Kolkata and a second boys' hostel not far from the existing one.
 
A commemorative stamp was issued by the Indian Post Office on 12 April 1985 depicting the campus and in its commentary recognising the school's contribution to society. In 2019, the foundation stone was laid for a new kindergarten section.

Programs 
Students have excelled on the Indian Certificate of Secondary Education exam. In 2015, a student secured the highest marks in the ICSE examination while in 2017 a student scored the highest marks, in the Indian School Certificate examination. In 2013 Xavier was ranked by Digital Learning as the top school in West Bengal.

The school is divided into houses namely Berchmans, Britto, Gonzaga and Loyola, all trained in synchronized marching. The tertiary section extended to coeducational Honors Arts and Science programs and Teacher Training while still on the high school campus.

In 2011 Xavier was judged the best eco-initiative school in Kolkata City for its preparation of compost manure for organic gardening. The school won a football tournament organized to promote outdoor exercise (so that youth do not become addicted to staying indoors with their computers). The traveling cricket team in 2016 secured the first place in a tournament in Leicester, England. In September 2016 the school hosted an exhibition of about 90 paintings of Mother Teresa to commemorate her canonization that month.

Steps toward university 
Xavier is expanding into tertiary education in collaboration with other groups, as with the Jesuit Xavier School of Management in Jamshedpur, on a new 17-acre campus in Rajarhat near New Town, Kolkata. A research centre with post-graduate courses is also planned. While schools of engineering and medicine are being considered, plans are progressing slowly to assure that fees will remain low and a wide range of students will be able to afford the education.

Notable alumni

 

 Vijay Balasubramanian, theoretical physicist and professor at the University of Pennsylvania
 Jyoti Basu, longest-serving Chief Minister of West Bengal (1977-2000)
 Kaushik Basu, senior vice-president, former chief economist of the World Bank (2012-2016), Carl Marks Professor of International Studies and Professor of Economics at Cornell University, President of the International Economic Association since June 2017
 Aditya Vikram Birla, industrialist
 Jagadish Chandra Bose, biologist, physicist, biophysicist, botanist, archaeologist and Fellow of the Royal Society
 Dhritiman Chatterjee, actor
 Barun De, historian; chairman, West Bengal Heritage Commission, Calcutta
 Utpal Dutt, actor
 Sourav Ganguly, former captain of the Indian cricket team and 39th President of the Board of Control for Cricket in India
 Sanjiv Goenka, chairman, RPG Enterprises
Ibrahim Suhrawardy, linguist, author and freedom fighter. 
 Shishir Bajoria, Chairman, SK Bajoria Group
  Dipankar Gupta, former Solicitor General of India 
 Raj Kapoor, actor, producer, director
 Aamil Keeyan Khan, actor, writer, director, musician
 Dilshad Khan, Hindustani classical singer
 P. Lal, writer
 Mahan Maharaj, mathematician, recipient of the 2011 Shanti Swarup Bhatnagar Award for Mathematical Sciences and recipient of the 2015 Infosys Prize for Mathematical Sciences
 Barry O'Brien, quizmaster, thespian and motivational coach
 Derek O'Brien, quizmaster, parliamentarian
 Neil O'Brien, quizmaster
 Norman Pritchard, dual silver medalist, 1900 Paris Olympics
 Siddhartha Shankar Ray, barrister, former  Chief Minister of West Bengal (1972-1977), Union Minister for Education (1971-1972) and Indian Ambassador to the United States (1992-1996)
 Somak Raychaudhury, astrophysicist, Director of the Inter-University Centre for Astronomy and Astrophysics, Pune
 General Shankar Roychoudhury, former Chief of Army Staff of the Indian Army and former member of the Indian Parliament
 Sanjeev Sanyal, economist, author, litterateur, Chief Economic Advisor to the Government of India
 Aditya Vikram Sengupta, filmmaker, cinematographer, graphic designer and artist
 Rabindranath Tagore, polymath, novelist, poet, musician, artist and the recipient of the 1913 Nobel Prize for Literature
 Satyendranath Tagore, first Indian to join the Indian Civil Service, elder brother of Rabindranath Tagore
 Shashi Tharoor, UN undersecretary, eminent parliamentarian and former External Affairs minister
Supratim Bhol - Indian Cinematographer
Ashrafuddin Ahmad Chowdhury, former general secretary of Congress Party

See also

 List of Jesuit schools
 List of schools in West Bengal

References

Jesuit secondary schools in India
Jesuit primary schools in India
Boys' schools in India
Christian schools in West Bengal
Primary schools in West Bengal
High schools and secondary schools in West Bengal
Schools in Kolkata
Educational institutions established in 1860
1860 establishments in British India